Linha da Beira Alta is an international railway line which connects Pampilhosa on the Linha do Norte, close to Coimbra, to the border with Spain, at Vilar Formoso.

The electrified, mostly single-track, iberian gauge (1,668 m) line runs parallel to the Mondego River.
It is the main railway access from Portugal to the rest of Europe. It was constructed by Companhia dos Caminhos de Ferro Portugueses da Beira Alta to open a new international link, closer to Coimbra, and to connect the line to the Port of Figueira da Foz. It was opened on 3 August 1882. During the modernisation and electrification in the 1980s and 90s the signalling and tracks were replaced.

See also 
 List of railway lines in Portugal
 List of Portuguese locomotives and railcars
 History of rail transport in Portugal

References

Sources

 

Bei
Iberian gauge railways
Railway lines opened in 1882